Sonic the Hedgehog 2 is a 1992 platform game developed by Sega for the Sega Genesis (Mega Drive).

Sonic the Hedgehog 2 may also refer to:

Sonic the Hedgehog 2 (film), a 2022 action-adventure film
Sonic the Hedgehog 2 (8-bit video game), a 1992 platform video game for the Sega Master System and Game Gear

See also
Sonic the Hedgehog (disambiguation)